Yevgeniya Mikhaylovna Bogdanovskaya (29 December 1917 – 15 September 1987) was a Russian diver. She competed in the 10 m platform at the 1952 Summer Olympics and finished in eighth place.

References

External links
Biography of Yevgeniya Bogdanovskaya 

1917 births
1987 deaths
Olympic divers of the Soviet Union
Divers at the 1952 Summer Olympics
Soviet female divers